Leonardo de Melo Vieira Leite (born 6 June 1986), commonly known as Leo Higuita, is a Brazilian born Kazakhstani futsal player who plays as a goalkeeper for AFC Kairat and the Kazakhstan national futsal team.

His goalscoring ability led to his nickname of "Higuita".

Honours
 UEFA Futsal Champions League: 2012/13, 2014/15

References

External links
AFC Kairat profile
FPF club profile
The Final Ball profile

1986 births
Living people
Futsal goalkeepers
Brazilian men's futsal players
Kazakhstani men's futsal players
C.F. Os Belenenses futsal players
Brazilian expatriate sportspeople in Portugal
Brazilian expatriate sportspeople in Kazakhstan
Brazilian emigrants to Kazakhstan
Naturalised citizens of Kazakhstan
Footballers from Rio de Janeiro (city)